Ann Downer (1960–2015) was an American writer, principally of fantasy novels for children and young adults, as well as short fiction and poetry.

Biography 

Ann Downer was born in Arlington, Virginia in 1960 and grew up in Manila and Bangkok and recalled avidly reading fantasy fiction.

Her first published work was a trilogy published in the late 1980s and early 1990s (The Spellkey, The Glass Salamander, and The Books of the Keepers), collected in a revised edition in 1995 as The Spellkey Trilogy. A second series for middle-grade readers, begun in 2003 with the novel Hatching Magic, continues with The Dragon of Never-Was (2006). The Spellkey series is high fantasy, taking place wholly in an invented world and chronicling a good-versus-evil story of two foundlings, a stableboy and an ostracized seer. Hatching Magic and its sequel, The Dragon of Never-Was, are contemporary fantasies with elements of time travel. The series follows a young girl, Theodora Oglethorpe, as she discovers a world of wizardry and magic. While Downer's books are frequently compared to the work of Patricia A. McKillip and Diana Wynne Jones, she has cited the influence of Ursula K. Le Guin's Earthsea books and the Chronicles of Prydain by Lloyd Alexander in shaping her outlook and prose style.

She was diagnosed with ALS in 2014 and died on 19 November 2015 in Boston, MA.

Bibliography 
Spellkey series
The Spellkey (1987), jacket by Caldecott-medal winner David Wiesner, also a UK paperback edition from Futura/Macmillan.
The Glass Salamander (1989), jacket by Caldecott-medal winner David Wiesner
The Books of the Keepers (1993)

All three books were collected into a paperback omnibus edition, The Spellkey Trilogy, published by Baen Books in 1995.

Hatching Magic series U.S. edition jackets by Omar Rayyan
Hatching Magic (2003; Scholastic Book Club selection; translated into German, Czech, Dutch, Italian, Portuguese, Polish, Thai, and Spanish; additional languages pending)
The Dragon of Never-Was (2006)

Other Fiction
"Somnus’s Fair Maid" (short-listed for the James Tiptree Jr. prize), a Regency retelling of the Sleeping Beauty fairy tale, in Black Thorn, White Rose, edited by Terri Windling and Ellen Datlow
Short stories and poetry in Gargoyle Magazine in the late 1980s, including excerpts from an unpublished novel.
"Bread-and-Butterflies" in Alice Redux (2006), a collection of short fiction inspired by Lewis Carroll and edited by Richard Peabody.

References

External links 
Author blog
Bibliography on fantasticfiction.co.uk

1960 births
2015 deaths
20th-century American novelists
21st-century American novelists
American fantasy writers
American children's writers
American women novelists
Smith College alumni
Harvard University staff
American women children's writers
Women science fiction and fantasy writers
20th-century American women writers
21st-century American women writers
Neurological disease deaths in Massachusetts
Deaths from motor neuron disease